Álvaro Fernández Llorente (born 13 April 1998) is a Spanish professional footballer who plays as a goalkeeper for RCD Espanyol, on loan from SD Huesca, and the Spain national team.

Club career
Born in Arnedo, La Rioja, Fernández was invited to play for Real Sociedad in several youth tournaments before signing for CA Osasuna aged 15. He made his senior debut with the reserves on 12 April 2015, starting in a 1–1 away draw against CD Izarra in the Tercera División.

On 25 September 2016 Fernández made his La Liga debut, coming on as a second-half substitute for the injured Mario Fernández in a 3–1 loss at Villarreal CF. It was his maiden appearance for the Osasuna first team, which suffered relegation as dead last.

On 11 July 2017, Fernández signed a three-year deal with Ligue 1 side AS Monaco FC. After only appearing with the reserve team, he returned to Spain on 7 August 2018, after agreeing to a one-year loan deal with Extremadura UD.

On 29 June 2019, Fernández left Monaco and agreed to a three-year contract with SD Huesca, newly relegated to the second division.

On 17 August 2021, Premier League club Brentford announced the signing of Fernandez on a one year loan-deal, with the option to make the move permanent at the end of the 2021–22 season. On 31 August of the following year, he moved to RCD Espanyol in the top tier, also in a temporary deal.

International career
Fernández represented Spain at several youth levels up to the under-21s, being the starting goalkeeper in the 2021 UEFA European Under-21 Championship (a namesake in the same position, the slightly younger Álvaro Fernández Calvo, was also selected during the same period).

Due to the isolation of some national team players following the positive COVID-19 test of Sergio Busquets, Spain's under-21 squad were called up for the senior team's international friendly against Lithuania on 8 June 2021. Fernández made his senior debut in the match, which ended in a 4–0 win; by doing so, he became the first Huesca player to appear for the Spain national team in the club's entire history.

Career statistics

Club

International

Honours
Spain U23
Summer Olympic silver medal: 2020

References

External links

Álvaro Fernández at lapreferente.com
Álvaro Fernández at brentfordfc.com

1998 births
Living people
People from Arnedo
Spanish footballers
Footballers from La Rioja (Spain)
Association football goalkeepers
La Liga players
Segunda División players
Segunda División B players
Tercera División players
CA Osasuna B players
CA Osasuna players
Extremadura UD footballers
SD Huesca footballers
RCD Espanyol footballers
AS Monaco FC players
Brentford F.C. players
Spain youth international footballers
Spain under-21 international footballers
Spain international footballers
Spanish expatriate footballers
Spanish expatriate sportspeople in France
Expatriate footballers in France
Spanish expatriate sportspeople in Monaco
Spanish expatriate sportspeople in England
Expatriate footballers in Monaco
Expatriate footballers in England
Olympic footballers of Spain
Footballers at the 2020 Summer Olympics
Olympic medalists in football
Olympic silver medalists for Spain
Medalists at the 2020 Summer Olympics
Championnat National 2 players
Premier League players